From her first film in 1974, Shabana Azmi has been part of over more than hundred projects.
She has received many national awards.

Films

Television

Short films

References 

Indian filmographies
Actress filmographies